Ocnerodrilidae is a family of annelids belonging to the order Haplotaxida.

Genera

Genera:
 Aphanascus Stephenson, 1924  
 Arraia Hernandez-Garcia, Burgos-Guerrero, Rousseau & James, 2018 
 Bauba Righi, 1980

References

Annelids